Admaston is a small hamlet in Staffordshire, England just outside the town of Rugeley near to Abbots Bromley and Blithfield Hall.

The name Admaston is derived from the Anglo-Saxon personal name Ēadmund and means 'Ēadmund's town'; it was recorded in the 12th century as Edmundestone and Admerdeston, and in the 13th century as Admundestan and Edmundestone.

It is a namesake of Admaston/Bromley township in Renfrew County, Eastern Ontario, Canada, which took part of its name from this hamlet in the 19th century.

References 

Borough of East Staffordshire
Hamlets in Staffordshire